The Consultant is an American thriller television series created by Tony Basgallop, based on the novel of the same name by Bentley Little and starring Christoph Waltz as the titular character, with Nat Wolff, Brittany O'Grady, and Aimee Carrero in supporting roles. The series follows the employees of a mobile gaming company whose leadership is taken over by a sinister consultant, played by Waltz.

The Consultant premiered on Amazon Prime Video on February 24, 2023 to positive reviews, with critics praising Waltz's performance but criticizing the series' writing and pace.

Premise
Regus Patoff, a mysterious consultant, comes to the rescue of CompWare, a mobile gaming company, after the murder of its CEO, and seemingly starts running the company.

Cast

Main
 Christoph Waltz as Regus Patoff
 Nat Wolff as Craig Horne
 Brittany O'Grady as Elaine Hayman
 Aimee Carrero as Patti, Craig's fiancée

Co-Starring
 Henry Rhoades as Tokyo
 Brian Yoon as Sang
 Tatiana Zappardino as Janelle
 Michael Charles Vaccaro as Iain
 Rumur Kristina Knowles as Lois
 Erin Ruth Walker as Amy
 Julie Sidoni as Newscaster
 Ryan Leckey as Newscaster
 Catherine Christensen as Rebecca Hood
 Ryan Bravo as Eric

Guest
 Sydney Mae Diaz as Raul
 Sloane Avery as Rosie
 Dianne Doan as Ghislane
 Jake Manley as Patrice
 Gloria John as Mama Sang

Episodes

Production
On November 18, 2021, it was revealed that Tony Basgallop would serve as showrunner on the TV series adaptation of Bentley Little’s novel The Consultant, with Basgallop executive producing the series along with Christoph Waltz, Matt Shakman, Steve Stark, Andrew Mittman, Kai Dolbashian through MGM Television, 1.21 Pictures, Toluca Pictures and Amazon Studios. Along with the announcement, Waltz was set to play Mr. Patoff in the series. On December 8, 2021, Brittany O'Grady and Nat Wolff were cast in the series. Filming began in December 2021 with plans to continue shooting through May 2022. Aimee Carrero was confirmed to star in March 2022.

Release 
On January 3, 2023, Amazon released a teaser for the series, for which they set a February 24, 2023 release date.

Reception 
The Consultant received mixed to positive reviews from critics. On Rotten Tomatoes, the series has a rating of 75% based on 32 reviews. The website's critical consensus reads, "With Christoph Waltz's menacing charm on retainer, The Consultant compensates for its lack of depth with slick presentation and diverting twists." On Metacritic, it has a score of 65 out of 100, indicating "generally favorable reviews".

John Anderson of The Wall Street Journal praised Waltz's performance, calling it "a mixed blessing in what is essentially a mystery in slow motion that keeps tilting toward comedy." However, he criticized the series' plotting and pace, stating that it "strings us along with unresolved questions, presuming we’ll stay fascinated, in a way that’s become irritatingly common among eight-part series." Daniel Fienberg of The Hollywood Reporter criticized the series as feeling "perplexingly rushed at times and oppressively elongated at others", noting the lack of stylistic cohesion between the episodes, and feeling that the series overall was "neither terrifying nor trenchant." Fienberg wrote that Waltz gave "a compulsively watchable performance that falls right into the Oscar winner’s comfort zone of seductive weirdness", but felt it too reminiscent of the actor's previous roles.

Annie Burke of The A.V. Club unfavorably compared the series to Apple TV+'s Severance, feeling that it "lacks the concentrated, speculative concept" of that series. However, she praised the production design, calling the series' fictional workplace "a character, a narrative device, and a motif all rolled into one." She too described Waltz's performance as derivative of his former roles, writing that The Consultant "amounts to Waltz reprising his role from Horrible Bosses 2 with a steely, vaguely supernatural twist." Nick Allen of RogerEbert.com criticized the series' writing for "piling on mysteries for the sake of getting stranger and stranger, without building a significant amount of tension." Kristen Baldwin of Entertainment Weekly was more positive, calling the series' story "marvelously weird and darkly funny." She praised the performances of the central cast, noting Waltz's "quiet menace", O'Grady's "wary longing", and Wolff's "winning vulnerability".

References

External links
 

2020s American comedy television series
2020s American workplace drama television series
2023 American television series debuts
Amazon Prime Video original programming
American thriller television series
English-language television shows
Television series based on American novels
Television series by Amazon Studios
Television series by MGM Television
Television series set in 2022
Television shows about video games
Television shows set in Los Angeles